"Balloons" is the first single from the album Antidotes by Foals. It is their fourth single in total to date. It was released as a digital download on 9 December 2007 and on CD and vinyl the following day.

The video was directed by Dave Ma and features crows, dancers in flapper dresses, a wall of flowers and Foals' artwork maestro Tinhead painting on a wall. Singer Yannis has described the crows as representing coal or fuel.

"Balloons" peaked at number 39 on the UK singles chart, and was voted in at 86 in NME's 100 Tracks of the Decade.

Track listings

References

External links
Official website

2007 singles
Foals songs
Songs written by Yannis Philippakis
Transgressive Records singles
2007 songs